Pharrsdale Historic District, also known as Eastover, is a national historic district located at Charlotte, Mecklenburg County, North Carolina. The district encompasses 166 contributing buildings in the former suburban Pharrsdale neighborhood of Charlotte.  It was developed after 1926 and includes notable examples of Colonial Revival and Tudor Revival style architecture.

It was added to the National Register of Historic Places in 2002.

References

Historic districts on the National Register of Historic Places in North Carolina
Colonial Revival architecture in North Carolina
Tudor Revival architecture in North Carolina
Buildings and structures in Charlotte, North Carolina
National Register of Historic Places in Mecklenburg County, North Carolina